Goddo is a small village in Suriname. The village sits on the Suriname River, 1.81 kilometres north of the Pikin River. Goddo can be reached via the Djoemoe Airstrip, or by boat from Pokigron. The village is home to Maroons of the Saramaka tribe.

References

Populated places in Sipaliwini District
Saramaka settlements